The American Independent, formerly known as Blue Nation Review  or Shareblue Media, is an American liberal news website. The American Independent's monthly reach is reported to be 140 million across platforms.

In December 2017, The American Independent, then Shareblue, announced a partnership with SiriusXM Progress. In November 2019, Shareblue Media became The American Independent.

History 
Under its original name Blue Nation Review, the site published a report on the spending habits of former U.S. Representative Aaron Schock (R-Ill.), playing a role in his eventual resignation.

In November 2015, the site was sold by Moko Social Media Limited, a multi-media platform developer, to Media Matters for America founder David Brock. Brock terminated almost all of the previous staff and hired Peter Daou – a former Clinton Senate-staffer who worked for her 2008 Presidential campaign as a digital media strategist – to head True Blue Media, LLC and to write for the website. The website relaunched as Shareblue in September 2016.

Brock said that the main goal of the website was to get presidential candidate Hillary Clinton elected.
During the primaries, the website endorsed Hillary Clinton and was critical of Bernie Sanders, posting stories like "With Bernie Sanders As Their Nominee, Democrats Can Kiss The Presidency Goodbye" and "Why does Bernie Sanders keep denigrating Hillary’s supporters?"  Tad Devine, a Sanders campaign consultant, called it "the pond scum of American politics". Nick Merrill, a spokesman for Clinton, viewed Shareblue more as a necessary voice in a world teeming with conservative radio, television and Internet outlets that fire up the Republican base.

After Clinton won the primary, Shareblue focused its attention on Donald Trump "exposing what it considers to be news coverage stacked against" Clinton. The group's major message was "that a shameful false equivalence was causing the media to soft-pedal Mr. Trump's many transgressions and overplay the few it could find on Mrs. Clinton".

In November 2019, Shareblue Media changed its name to The American Independent, stating that it would "go forward with an increased focus on investigative journalism in preparation for 2020 coverage".

References

External links 
 

American news websites
American political websites
Companies based in Washington, D.C.
Internet properties established in 2014